Undercover Slut, also known as UCS and stylised as VNDERCOVER SLVT, is a French-American shock rock and glam punk group, based in Paris, France. Throughout the history of the band, there have been multiple line-up changes and nearly thirty people have been involved with the band; while certain musicians contribute to music, vocals and lyrics, 'O' remains the only constant member.

Although the group are most often referred to as a form of industrial music and indeed used that as part of their sound, they also implement strong elements of punk rock influence and gothic rock, topped off with an image similar to glam rock. Undercover Slut have been a feature in underground music, particularly in Europe since the 1990s, though they have also toured the United States several times. In terms of musical releases, the band has put out many self-produced recordings, their first official full-length album was Communism Is Fascism released in 2004, which has gained them attention.

Sound and image
The group play have been covered by glam media sources, and even had songs released on a couple glam compilations for USA's Delinquent Records. This is most likely because of their image, which incorporates heavy use of make-up.

Undercover Slut's make-up bears a resemblance to that of the geisha, with striking white foundation topped off with bright red lipstick and black eye make-up. Due to darker elements of Glam in their image, the band are sometimes compared to Marilyn Manson by media who are not familiar with the band. However, Undercover Slut have stated strong opposition to that group, dismissing Brian Warner as a "clown" and quipping "That 'god of fat' needs to call it quits".

Frontman 'O' (A.K.A. Letter Number Thief-Teen and Romeo Gestapo), has cited punk rock bands Sex Pistols and the New York Dolls as an influence on Undercover Slut; this is mirrored in their music, which follows anti-establishment themes. The band themselves describe their music as "that perfect sexual intercourse between creepy deathrock, '77 punk rock nostalgia, industrial darkness and a so fuckin' pretty larger-than-life glamour Image."

Animal rights and philanthropy 
'O' is passionate about campaigning for animal rights, and is said to be devout vegetarian, Undercover Slut even has a section dedicated to them on the Animal Liberation Front website, as well as an interview discussing their beliefs. On their album Communism Is Fascism, Undercover Slut have a track regarding this, a blank 1 minute track titled "Sixty Silent Seconds to Repent for Your Animal Genocide". It is not only animal rights the band covers, they have also played an anti-paedophilia concert in Paris, France in July 2005.

Biography
The band has existed in various forms since October 1995. Going through several line-up changes with leader 'O' remaining as the only constant member. The musicians of Undercover Slut are only referred to and known by their stage names.

During the 1990s, Undercover Slut self-released various E.P.'s through their own Hateful Society Production label. Their first demo album Lipstikk Whore No. 666 was released through Scream in Japan exclusively.

Communism Is Fascism
2004 saw the band releasing their second demo album Fuck That Celebrity Trash & Your Ghetto Cunt Drama. Shortly after the release of their second demo album, Undercover Slut signed to Apokalypse Records, opened their MySpace account on September 27, 2004, and released their first album Communism Is Fascism on December 24, 2004. leaving Apokalypse Records the following year, for a 2-record deal with Free-Will (Dir En Grey's label) in July 2005.

In interviews 'O' often refers to their hometown as "Psychotic Paris, Fucked-up France". Undercover Slut went through several record label changes in 2005 and 2006, first Free-Will, but the band left after becoming unhappy with the European label manager's work ethic.

February 2006 saw Undercover Slut sign to SixSixSix Records, a British label which was set up by former Christian Death manager Tim Fraser and Cradle Of Filth bassist Dave Pybus. During that period, the band performed live at London's Underworld and appeared on U.K. television show Redemption TV. SixSixSix Records being financially unable to produce and release any Undercover Slut recordings, 'O' decided to leave this label to concentrate on his own record label: Offensive Records.

The White Whore era and Amerikkka Macht Frei
An album was planned for release in 2006 via Free-Will: Inside That Cult That Loves to Terror, but this did not see the light of day. Undercover Slut embarked on their fourth tour of the United States which started on August 8 in New York City, it was named the "Genocide, Homicide & Suicide - Amerikkka Tour 2K6".

'O' introduced new members into Undercover Slut, in the form of guitarist Divine, bassist Drag, and drummer Fake; this change was referred to as the band entering "The White Whore" era. With this line-up, the band played their fifth tour of the United States, known as the "White Whore Supremacy - Amerikkka Tour 2K7"; it started again in New York City at Snitch, a club owned by Velvet Revolver members.

In September 2007, Undercover Slut started pre-production at Next Level Studio in Los Angeles with producer Stevo Bruno (Brides of Destruction, Mötley Crüe), then recorded and mixed their brand new album Amerikkka Macht Frei at the Chop Shop in Los Angeles. The thirteen track album, set to include a cover version of The Cure's "Killing an Arab", also features some guest musicians. Matthew Roberts (Charles Manson's son) is featured in a spoken word duet with 'O' on the track "Jesus Kills! Coroner Saves!", Eric Griffin (Synical, ex-Murderdolls, Wednesday 13) plays lead guitar on the track "Kastration Kar Krashes" and Teddy Heavens (Rebel Rebel, Los Angeles Death Dolls) plays lead guitar on "Dali Was a Junkie".

Amerikkka Macht Frei was produced by Chris Baseford (Tommy Lee, Methods of Mayhem, John 5, Rob Zombie, Genitorturers), assisted by Will Thompson (Rob Zombie). Undercover Slut's Amerikkka Macht Frei record sleeve was done by Dean Karr (whose previous record sleeves include Marilyn Manson's Antichrist Superstar, Slipknot's Slipknot and Amen's Amen & We Have Come for Your Parents).

Undercover Slut's Amerikkka Macht Frei was released on Monday, December 8, 2008, via Offensive Records (OR 999). CD format includes an uncensored video version of "Shadow Song", filmed by Dean Karr (who directed Marilyn Manson's "Sweet Dreams" and Amen's "The Price of Reality").

So far, rave reviews have been published in Kerrang! Magazine, Metal Hammer U.K. quoting Undercover Slut as "the best new band in ages!". Two sold-out shows in Paris: Undercover Slut were offered to open for The Damned at legendary's Gibus Club, then later on performed with Dio - Distraught Overlord at Le Trabendo, which was greatly reviewed in U.K.'s Bizarre Magazine.

In 2009, Undercover Slut headlined La Locomotive in Paris, France where Teddy Heavens (Rebel Rebel, Los Angeles Death Dolls) joined UCS on stage for "Dali Was a Junkie" and Mötley Crüe's "Shout at the Devil", co-headlined the J-Music Fest II in Lyon, France and headlined the GoreNight Fest 2009 in Dunkerque, France as a 5-piece band introducing Drag as a rhythm guitarist.

In Spring 2010, Amerikkka Macht Frei has been re-released as a 13-track Digipak CD and as a 12-song white vinyl LP and 12-song black vinyl LP via Deadlight Entertainment (Synical, Sister, Prophets Of Addiction, New Rising Son, Acey Slade & the Dark Party).

On August 30, 2010, 'O' came up on stage and provided backing vocals for Rebel Rebel at the Viper Room in Los Angeles.

On September 11, 2010, Undercover Slut headlined London's Slimelight as a charity show for the Sophie Lancaster Foundation.

On December 13, 2010, 'O' performed live as Romeo Gestapo, opening for New York City rapper Necro at La Bellevilloise in Paris, France.

The Jet Black Mafia era and Haters Gonna Hate
On January 29, 2011, Undercover Slut opened for the Murderdolls at l'Elysee Montmartre in Paris, France in front of nearly 1,400 people, premiering The Jet Black Mafia era. On February 19, 2011, Undercover Slut headlined the Imbolc Breizh Metal Fest 2011 in the heart of legendary's Broceliande woods. During that fest, 'O' did a cameo appearance on Orties Plus Putes que Toutes les Putes live promo-video. On May 28, 2011, Undercover Slut headlined a deathrock festival at Bateau Concorde Atlantique in Paris, France. Right in the middle of the Summer 2011 English riots, Undercover Slut headlined Nambucca in London, England on August 7, 2011. Undercover Slut's "Shadow Song" has been featured on Kinryu-No-Mai [-Tribute and Support to Japan-], a charity compilation CD for 2011 Japanese tsunami victims.

On November 15, 2012, Undercover Slut opened for Wednesday 13 at La Boule Noire in Paris, France. On February 11, 2013, Undercover Slut opened for The 69 Eyes at Le Nouveau Casino in Paris, France, marking the return of Undercover Slut's White Whore Era member Drag on bass guitar. On April 9, 2013, a preview mix of the song "Laughing Like Hyenas" has been featured on the playlist of The Watt from Pedro Show, the podcast run by Mike Watt (The Stooges, The Minutemen).

On May 23, 2015, "Choroform Nation", the new single has been available via all digital platforms. On November 13, 2015, "Chloroform Nation" has been released as a Digipak CD.

On April 16, 2016, Offensive Records released a 6-Track Digipak CD named "Inside That Cult That Loves Terror" exclusively for Record Store Day.

On January 1, 2020, UCS released the album, Haters Gonna Hate via Offensive Records on the following worldwide streaming platforms: Spotify, Deezer, Napster, Tidal, iTunes, AppleMusic, AmazonMusic.

A new album is actually planned for a late 2022 release.

Members

Current
 'O' -  lead and background vocals

Discography

Albums
Haters Gonna Hate (10-song LP) Offensive Records 2020
Amerikkka Macht Frei (10-song cassette tape) Offensive Records 2018
Amerikkka Macht Frei (12-song white Vinyl LP) Offensive Records / Deadlight / Underclass 2010
Amerikkka Macht Frei (12-song black Vinyl LP) Offensive Records / Deadlight / Underclass 2010
Amerikkka Macht Frei (13-track enhanced Digipack CD w/ uncensored "Shadow Song" video) Offensive Records / Deadlight / Underclass 2010
Amerikkka Macht Frei (12-track enhanced CD w/ uncensored "Shadow Song" video) Offensive Records / Sounds 2008
Communism Is Fascism (15-track enhanced CD w/ "Legalize Suicide" video) Hateful Society Production / Apocalypse / Season Of Mist 2004
Communism Is Fascism (15-track enhanced CD w/ "Legalize UCS" video - DVD Box) Hateful Society Production / Apocalypse / Season Of Mist 2004

EPs
The NKF Sessions (3-track CD) Offensive Records 2018
Inside That Cult That Loves Terror (6-track Digipak CD) Offensive Records 2016
Thirty Minutes Kills (7-track CD) Scream 2016
VICE (3-track CD) Offensive Records 2014
Hollywood Noir (3-song Vinyl LP) Offensive Records / Diess Prod / Musicast 2008
The White Whore Era EP (6-track CD) Offensive Records 2006
The Van Gogh Disease (6-track CD) Offensive Records 2006
Drama-Sick Democra-Sin (3-track enhanced CD w/ "Darling Darling" video) Hateful Society Production / Free-Will / Musicast 2005
Our Legalize Suicide Sessions (3-track CD) Hateful Society Production 2003
Naziconographick: Terrorism Tracks For Nihilistic Numbers (7-track CD) Hateful Society Production 2002
Sadistic Sampler (9-track CD) Hateful Society Production 2000
Undercover Slut (cassette tape) Hateful Society Production 1999
Lipstikk Whore No. 666 (cassette tape) Hateful Society Production 1998
Foreplay... (cassette tape) Hateful Society Production 1995

Singles
Black Phillip (Digital Single) Offensive Records 2017
Only Sick Music Makes Money Today (2-Song 7" Clear Vinyl) Offensive Records 2017
Chloroform Nation (1-Track Digipak CD) Offensive Records 2015
Chloroform Nation (iTunes Single) Offensive Records 2015
Evil Star Virus (1-Track CD) Hateful Society Production 2002
Addicted, Obsessed & Possessed (2-Song Cassette Tape) Hateful Society Production 1996

Demos
Fuck That Celebrity Trash & Your Ghetto Cunt Drama (7-track CD) Hateful Society Production 2004
Lipstikk Whore N°666 (12-track CD) Scream (Japan) 2000

Split CDs
Rebel Slut (6-track Split CD w/ Rebel Rebel) FTW Records & Filmworks / CafePress (U.S.A.) 2005

Compilations
Kinryu-No-Mai - Tribute And Support To Japan Nos Prod. (Japan) 2011
Generation Dead - A Compilation From The Dark Side Of Music Dead Records (Australia) 2010
Riot On Sunset - Vol. 1 - Soundtrack To The Underground 272 Records (U.S.A.) 2007
Lost Anarchy - Volume No. 2: Mojo World Disorder Demons In Exile Records (U.S.A.) 2006
Lost Anarchy - Volume 1: Buy Or Die! Demons In Exile Records (U.S.A.) 2005
An Hour With Bubblegum Slut Bubblegum Slut (U.K.) 2002
Lipstikk Killerz - Vol. 1 Lollypop Records (France) 1998
The Pink And The Black - a goth & glam collection Delinquent Records (U.S.A.) 1998
It's Only Indie Rock N' Roll But I Like It!!! - Compilation 2 Delinquent Records (U.S.A.) 1996

References

External links
 UNDERCOVER SLUT | Listen and Stream Free Music, Albums, New Releases, Photos, Videos
 CD Baby Music Store
 CD Baby Music Store
 UNDERCOVER SLUT (Unofficial Fansite)

Animal Liberation Front
Musical groups established in 1995
French alternative rock groups
French industrial music groups
Musical groups from Paris